Thomas Myddelton may refer to:

Thomas Myddelton (Lord Mayor of London) (1550–1631), fourth son of Richard Myddelton, Governor of Denbigh, and Jane Dryhurst
Thomas Myddelton (younger) (1586–1666), English politician and Parliamentary general
Sir Thomas Myddelton, 1st Baronet (1624–1663)
Sir Thomas Myddelton, 2nd Baronet (–1684)

See also
Thomas Middleton (disambiguation)